Xanagahyolu (also, Xanagah yolu) is a village in the municipality of Güləzi in the Quba Rayon of Azerbaijan.

References

Populated places in Quba District (Azerbaijan)